John Vernon (13 June 1940 – 2 June 2005) was a New Zealand cricketer. He played in two first-class matches for Central Districts in 1961/62.

See also
 List of Central Districts representative cricketers

References

External links
 

1940 births
2005 deaths
New Zealand cricketers
Central Districts cricketers
Cricketers from Whanganui